Good Shepherd IV is a Scottish ferry, connecting Fair Isle to Shetland Mainland. It is owned and operated by SIC Ferries.

History
The ship, built in St Monans, Fife, has been in service since 1986 and is operated by the Shetland Islands Council.

The previous ferry on this route, Good Shepherd III, was a former inshore trawler, owned by the islanders since 1972.

A news report in September 2020 indicated that some members of Council believed that the 31-year-old Good Shepherd IV was due for replacement but that Holyrood had not authorized that expenditure. Councillor Allison Duncan was quoted as saying, "I think it's despicable that they can't at least look after one of our remote islands by giving them the boat that they justly deserve."

Service
The ferry carries up to 12 passengers and one car.

There are sailings three times a week from Grutness Pier near Sumburgh Head in summer and one per week in winter. There are fortnightly sailings from Lerwick, the capital of Shetland.

References

Ferries of Scotland
Transport in Shetland
1986 ships
1986 in Scotland
Fair Isle